MLB 12: The Show is a Major League Baseball video game which was published by Sony Computer Entertainment and developed by San Diego Studio. The game was released on March 6, 2012 for the PlayStation 3 and PlayStation Vita. It is also the second installment of the series to be compatible with PlayStation Move.

Adrián González, first baseman of the Boston Red Sox, was awarded the title of cover athlete after he batted .338 with 27 home runs and 117 runs batted in during the 2011 season. González is the third Red Sox player to be awarded the cover, the first being David Ortiz for MLB 06: The Show, and the second being Dustin Pedroia for MLB 09: The Show.

On January 23, 2012, it was reported that there would be a separate cover for Canadian buyers, with Toronto Blue Jays right fielder/third baseman José Bautista on the cover. Bautista batted .302 with 43 home runs and 103 runs batted in during the 2011 season.

This marks the first year where the game is not developed for the PlayStation 2 or PlayStation Portable. However, it's the first installment of the series on Sony's newer handheld, the PlayStation Vita.

A commercial for the game involves the city of Chicago celebrating after the Cubs win the World Series at Wrigley Field, ending the longest drought championship drought in MLB history of what it could've been 104 years, and then it is revealed that the moment is played out on the game itself. (Four years later, the real Cubs won the Series, but clinched on the road at Progressive Field in Cleveland, not in their home ballpark.)

Soundtrack

Reception

The game received "generally favorable reviews" on both platforms according to the review aggregation website Metacritic.

References

External links

2012 video games
Major League Baseball video games
North America-exclusive video games
PlayStation 3 games
PlayStation Move-compatible games
PlayStation Vita games
Video games set in Canada
Video games set in the United States
Sports video games with career mode
 12
Sony Interactive Entertainment games
Multiplayer and single-player video games
Video games developed in the United States
Video games set in Maryland
San Diego Studio games